Teyon is a Polish video games developer, producer and online publisher for all leading platforms including PC, Nintendo Switch, PlayStation 4, Xbox One and mobiles. Founded in 2006, the company has two offices in Poland (Kraków and Łódź) and one in Tokyo, Japan, with three development teams in total working on delivering games.

History

The company was founded in 2006 in Kraków, Poland.

In 2007, Teyon released Burn, the first FPS in the company's portfolio. It was followed by Battle Rage and District Wars: Pure Action in 2008 and Blind Shot: Assassin's Confession in 2009.

In 2009, Teyon debuted on Nintendo Download services with DSiWare puzzle games Robot Rescue and Ball Fighter, followed by Hubert the Teddy Bear: Winter Games a WiiWare family game in 2010. The same year 4 games other games were published on DSiWare including 101 MiniGolf World (arcade sports), 1001 Crystal Mazes Collection (puzzle), Super Swap (puzzle) and 101 Shark Pets (pet caring simulation).

Teyon also released an arcade shooting series for WiiWare, PlayStation 3 and Xbox 360. The first part Heavy Fire: Special Operations appeared in July 2010 in North America and December 2010 in Europe. Sequels, Heavy Fire: Black Arms for WiiWare and Heavy Fire: Afghanistan for PC, PlayStation 3 and Wii, were released in 2011, followed by Heavy Fire: Shattered Spear in January 2013 on PlayStation 3 and Xbox 360.

In 2012, Teyon released a number of Nintendo eShop games, including Crazy Chicken: Pirates, Outdoors Unleashed: Africa 3D and Bird Mania 3D which reached number 1 in the Nintendo eShop Charts. Since 2012 Teyon started a research project Audio and Video Raytracer (RAYAV) in consortium with AGH DSP. The project is aimed to make an audio and video engine of a new generation.

In 2018, Teyon founded a sister company in Łódź under the name Digital Bards, which acts as a developer and digital publisher of casual games. The company is a whole subsidiary of Teyon, and focuses on delivering and publishing indie, casual and easy-to-pick & easy-to-play entertainment across all markets around the globe. Digital Bards's products are designed for consoles and personal computers and are delivered through physical retail, digital download and online platforms.

In September 2019, a new title from Teyon was announced. Terminator: Resistance is a first-person shooter action video game, set to be released on 15 November 2019 in Europe and Australia, and on 3 December 2019 in North America. Its story is set in post-apocalyptic 2028 Los Angeles and serves as a prequel to James Cameron's Terminator franchise films The Terminator (1984) and Terminator 2: Judgment Day (1991). Players take on the role of a new character, Jacob Rivers, a soldier in the John Connor-led human resistance against Skynet's robotic killing machines. The game has multiple possible endings.

Activity in Japan 

At the end of 2011, Teyon became one of the very few western companies that obtained a license from Nintendo to publish games in Japan. In the past, Teyon Japan published titles on the Nintendo 3DS, DSiWare, WiiWare, WiiU, PlayStation 3 and mobile platforms such as au Smart Pass by KDDI. Currently, the company focuses on the Nintendo Switch and PlayStation 4.

Notable titles published by Teyon Japan include Moonlighter, Bomber Crew, X Morph: Defence, The Way Remastered, The Flame in the Flood and many more. The scope of services offered by Teyon Japan includes translations, QA & localization, publishing, ratings, public relations & marketing.

Games developed

References

External links 
 Official website

Video game companies established in 2006
Video game companies of Poland
Companies based in Kraków
Video game publishers
Video game development companies
Polish companies established in 2006